"Hawaii" is a song written by Brian Wilson and Mike Love for the American rock band the Beach Boys. It was recorded in July 1963 and released on their 1963 album Surfer Girl. It is one of the first Beach Boy songs that Hal Blaine played on, contributing timbales, but regular drummer Dennis Wilson still played. In January 1964, it was released as a single in Australia, becoming a top-10 hit. "Hawaii" made its way into the Beach Boys repertoire almost 50 years later.

Chart performance
"Hawaii" was released in Australia as a single, where it was reported as number two by Cash Box, charting at that position in the surveys of the premier radio stations of both Sydney and Brisbane during the Beach Boys' tour of Australia in February 1964. It was tabulated as eleventh for Australia's end-of-year survey.

Performers
The Beach Boys
David Marks – harmony and backing vocals; rhythm guitar
Mike Love – lead, harmony and backing vocals
Brian Wilson – lead, harmony and backing vocals; piano
Al Jardine – harmony and backing vocals, bass guitar
Carl Wilson – harmony and backing vocals; lead guitar
Dennis Wilson – harmony and backing vocals, drums
 Session musicians and production staff
Hal Blaine – timbales
 Chuck Britz – sound engineer

Other notable covers

Hep Stars version 

Swedish rock group Hep Stars recorded "Hawaii" as the B-Side to their 1966 single "Sunny Girl", one of the earliest Benny Andersson compositions. While "Sunny Girl" was a hit, reaching number 1 on both Kvällstoppen and Tio i Topp, "Hawaii", despite being issued as the B-side, managed to chart on Kvällstoppen due to the popularity of Hep Stars. It stayed on the chart for two weeks, peaking at number 7 on March 22, 1966. "Hawaii" was recorded by the group as a joke, in style with their debut single "Kana Kapila" and "Mashed Potatoes".

Personnel 
 Svenne Hedlund – lead vocals
 Janne Frisk – harmony vocals, guitar
 Lennart Hegland – backing vocals
 Benny Andersson – tambourine, backing vocals
 Christer Pettersson – harmony vocals, drums

Charts

References

1963 songs
The Beach Boys songs
Hep Stars songs
Songs written by Brian Wilson
Songs written by Mike Love
Song recordings produced by Brian Wilson
Capitol Records singles
1963 singles
Songs about Hawaii